Daniela Constantina Rațiu (born 14 September 1988) is a Romanian handball player for Gloria Bistrița.

International honours 
EHF Cup:
Semifinalist: 2016
Youth European Championship:
Silver Medalist: 2005
Junior European Championship:
Bronze Medalist: 2007

References

1988 births
Living people
Sportspeople from Slatina, Romania
Romanian female handball players